The 2016 African Nations Championship, also known for short as the 2016 CHAN and for sponsorship purposes as the Orange African Nations Championship, was the 4th edition of the biennial African association football tournament organized by CAF featuring national teams consisting of players playing in their respective national leagues. It was held in Rwanda from 16 January to 7 February 2016.

The defending champions Libya failed to qualify for this edition. It was the first edition which featured the semi-final stage consisting of the runners-up from all 4 groups and the last to be sponsored by Orange as French energy and petroleum giant Total was set to take over from the following edition onward.

Qualification

Rwanda qualified automatically as hosts with the remaining spots being determined by the qualifying rounds which took place between June and October 2015.

Qualified teams

Venues
CAF approved 4 stadiums provided by the Rwanda Football Federation.

Squads

All teams consisted of a maximum of 23 players.

Draw
The draw for this edition of the tournament took place on 15 November 2015, 72 hours earlier than planned, at 18:30 CAT (UTC+2), in Kigali. The 16 teams were drawn into four groups of four.

The teams were seeded based on their results in the previous 3 editions: 2009 (multiplied by 1), 2011 (multiplied by 2) and 2014 (multiplied by 3):
7 points for winner
5 points for runner-up
3 points for semi-finalists
2 points for quarter-finalists
1 point for group stage

Based on the formula above, the four pots were allocated as follows:

Group stage
The top two teams of each group advanced to the knockout stage.

Tiebreakers
The teams were ranked according to points (3 points for a win, 1 point for a draw, 0 points for a loss). If tied on points, tiebreakers would be applied in the following order:
Number of points obtained in games between the teams concerned;
Goal difference in games between the teams concerned;
Goals scored in games between the teams concerned;
If, after applying criteria 1 to 3 to several teams, two teams still have an equal ranking, criteria 1 to 3 are reapplied exclusively to the matches between the two teams in question to determine their final rankings. If this procedure does not lead to a decision, criteria 5 to 7 apply;
Goal difference in all games;
Goals scored in all games;
Drawing of lots.

All times were local; CAT (UTC+2).

Group A

Group B

Group C

Group D

Knockout stage
In the knockout stage, if a match was level at the end of normal playing time, extra time would be played (two periods of 15 minutes each) and followed, if necessary, by kicks from the penalty mark to determine the winner, except for the third place match where no extra time would be played.

Bracket

Quarter-finals

Semi-finals

Third place play-off

Final

Goalscorers
Below is the list of goalscorers.

4 goals

 Elia Meschak
 Chisom Chikatara
 Ahmed Akaïchi

3 goals

 Jonathan Bolingi
 Ernest Sugira

2 goals

 Ary Papel
 Yazid Atouba
 Alsény Camara Agogo
 Ibrahima Sory Sankhon
 Koffi Boua
 Abdelghani Mouaoui
 Saad Bguir

1 goal

 Gelson Dala
 Moumi Ngamaleu
 Samuel Nlend
 Merveille Bokadi
 Botuli Bompunga
 Doxa Gikanji
 Guy Lusadisu
 Héritier Luvumbu
 Jean-Marc Makusu Mundele
 Nelson Munganga
 Seyoum Tesfaye
 Aaron Boupendza
 Franck Obambou
 Kilé Bangoura
 Aboubacar Leo Camara
 Aboubacar Iyanga Sylla
 Essis Aka
 Djobo Atcho
 Gbagnon Badie
 Treika Blé
 Guiza Djédjé
 Serge N'Guessan
 Yannick Zakri
 Yves Bissouma
 Abdoulaye Diarra
 Aliou Dieng
 Sékou Koïta
 Hamidou Sinayoko
 Moussa Sissoko
 Mohamed Aziz
 Abdeladim Khadrouf
 Victorien Adebayor
 Adamou Moussa
 Mossi Issa Moussa
 Osas Okoro
 Emery Bayisenge
 Hegman Ngomirakiza
 Mohamed Ben Amor
 Hichem Essifi
 Mohamed Ali Moncer
 Farouk Miya
 Joseph Ochaya
 Geofrey Serunkuma
 Isaac Chansa
 Christopher Katongo
 William Manondo

1 own goal

 Joël Kimwaki (against Angola)
 Mohamed Youla (against Ivory Coast)

Awards
Below is the list of awards.
Best Player: Elia Meschak (DR Congo)
Top scorer: Elia Meschak (DR Congo): 4 goals and two assist
Goal of the Tournament: Serge N'Guessan (Côte d’Ivoire) against Cameroon
Fair Play Trophy: DR Congo
Best XI
Goalkeeper: Ley Matampi (DR Congo)
Defenders: Abdoul Karim Danté (Mali), Joël Kimwaki (DR Congo), Cheick Ibrahim Comara (Côte d’Ivoire), Mohamed Youla (Guinea)
Midfielders: Ibrahima Sory Sankhon (Guinea), Mechack Elia (DR Congo), N’Guessan Serge (Côte d’Ivoire), Hamidou Sinayoko (Mali)
Forwards: Jonathan Bolingi (DR Congo), Sekou Koïta (Mali)
Substitutes: Badra Ali Sangaré (Côte d’Ivoire), Djigui Diarra (Mali), Lomalisa Mutambala (DR Congo), Heritier Luvumbu (DR Congo), Daouda Camara (Guinea), Aka Essis (Côte d’Ivoire), Ernest Sugira (Rwanda), Ahmed Akaïchi (Tunisia), Elvis Chisom Chikataba (Nigeria), Christopher Katongo (Zambia)

Final ranking
Below is the final ranking.

References

External links
  (archived) at CAFOnline.com

2016 in Rwandan sport
2016 in African football
African Nations Championship
2016 African Nations Championship
January 2016 sports events in Africa
February 2016 sports events in Africa
International association football competitions hosted by Rwanda